John Meyrick was a British agriculturist and rower who died in 2004.

John Meyrick may also refer to:

John Meyrick (bishop) (1538–1599), Anglican clergyman
John Meyrick (politician) (b. 1674), Welsh politician and judge

See also
John Merrick (MP) (1584–1659), Parliamentary MP for Newcastle-under Lyme, 1640
Jonathan Meyrick (born 1952), Bishop of Lynn